TGV Cinemas Sdn Bhd (also known as TGV Pictures and formerly known as Tanjong Golden Village) is the second largest cinema chain in Malaysia. As of March 2019, TGV Cinemas had 38 multiplexes with 310 screens and more than 50,000 seats. TGV Cinemas is headquartered at Maxis Tower, Kuala Lumpur.

History
Orange Sky Golden Harvest, a cinema operator based in Hong Kong was instrumental in the formation of Tanjong Golden Village, a joint venture with Tanjong of Malaysia and Village Roadshow of Australia. Tanjong bought out the remaining stakes for full ownership. The first TGV cinema in Malaysia opened in November 1994 at Bukit Raja Shopping Centre. More than 30 cinemas were opened around Malaysia only during 2005. The first English movie to be shown was King Kong, and the second Tamil movie was Anniyan. In 2013, TGV started distributing movies theatrically.

Locations

As of November 2020, TGV currently has 38 locations in Malaysia: 35 in Peninsular Malaysia and 3 in Sarawak.

Johor

Kuala Lumpur

Malacca

Negeri Sembilan

Penang

Perak

Sabah

Sarawak

Selangor

Terengganu

See also
 Golden Screen Cinemas
 MBO Cinemas
 Lotus Five Star
 List of cinemas in Malaysia

References

Cinema chains in Malaysia
Entertainment companies established in 1994
Privately held companies of Malaysia
1994 establishments in Malaysia
Film distributors of Malaysia